Ruth Jebet (born 17 November 1996) is a Kenyan-born long-distance runner and steeplechase specialist who competes internationally for Bahrain.  She was the world record holder and was the 2016 Olympic gold medalist in the 3000 metres steeplechase, both achieved before turning 20. In 2018 she was suspended for testing positive for EPO.

Career
Jebet took the opportunity to run for Bahrain at the age of sixteen, transferring her eligibility in February 2013. In April she won the 3000 metres and the 5000 metres at the Kenyan high school championships.

The teenager excelled in her debut outing for Bahrain, coming second in the 3000 metres steeplechase to Moroccan Olympian Salima El Ouali Alami at the 2013 Arab Athletics Championships. Her time of 9:52.47 minutes was a Bahraini national record for the event. She improved upon her own mark that July at the 2013 Asian Athletics Championships, where she seized the lead from the start and never relinquished her position. She defeated pre-race favourite and Asian Games champion Sudha Singh by more than fifteen seconds and her time of 9:40.84 minutes was a new championship record. This time ranked her as the top Asia steeplechase runner that year.

In 2014, still only 17, she won the World Junior Championship ahead of two other Kenyan girls.  That same month at the Weltklasse Zurich with older competition, she set the Asian continental record at 9:20.55, missing the World junior record by only 0.13 of a second (ranking her #31 of all time).

In the 2016 Summer Olympics, she became the first Bahraini athlete to win an Olympic gold medal by winning the 3000m steeplechase with a time of 8:59.75 making her the second fastest within the event of all time. She finished ahead of Kenya's  Hyvin Jepkemoi, who ran 9:07.12 to take silver, and American Emma Coburn, who ran 9:07.63 to capture the bronze.

On 27 August 2016, at the Paris stage of the 2016 IAAF Diamond League, Jebet smashed the existing 3000-metres steeplechase world record running at 8:52.78, more than six seconds faster than the old record.

In March 2018, Jebet became embroiled in a drug-testing scandal when she tested positive for r-EPO (recombinant erythropoietin), a performance-enhancing drug that increases stamina by producing more red blood cells. Her agent at the time, Marc Corstjens, denied any knowledge. Jebet told the Athletics Integrity Unit (AIU) she had not taken it intentionally, but after a two-year investigation into the matter a disciplinary tribunal in March 2020 ruled against her, handing down a four-year suspension, which began on 18 February 2018, and stripped Jebet of all her results from 1 December 2017 to 4 February 2018. The ruling didn't affect her gold medal from the 2016 Olympics because she won that before testing positive, nor did it affect her 2016 world record performance. 

Jebet has been a controversial figure in Kenya because she switched allegiances to run for Bahrain, offending many Kenyans who have accused her of disloyalty. Running for Bahrain she benefits financially far better than if she ran for Kenya. It was reported she received $500,000 USD, (the equivalent to 52 million Kenyan shillings) from the Bahrain government for winning her Olympic gold medal. As point of comparison, two-time 800 metres gold medalist and world record holder David Rudisha, running for Kenya, was paid about 1 million Kenyan shillings, about $10,000 USD.

References

External links

Living people
1996 births
Kenyan female long-distance runners
Bahraini female long-distance runners
Kenyan female steeplechase runners
Kenyan emigrants to Bahrain
Naturalized citizens of Bahrain
Bahraini female steeplechase runners
Asian Games gold medalists for Bahrain
Asian Games medalists in athletics (track and field)
Athletes (track and field) at the 2014 Asian Games
World Athletics Championships athletes for Bahrain
Athletes (track and field) at the 2016 Summer Olympics
Olympic athletes of Bahrain
Foreign-born athletes of Bahrain
Olympic gold medalists for Bahrain
Medalists at the 2016 Summer Olympics
Olympic gold medalists in athletics (track and field)
World Athletics record holders
Olympic female steeplechase runners
Medalists at the 2014 Asian Games
Diamond League winners
Islamic Solidarity Games medalists in athletics